Unsolved Mysteries is a pop duo from Brooklyn NY.  Formed in 2004 as a solo project of Jon Lynn, it was later joined by producer Colin Alexander.
The song "You Only Live Once" was used on the American TV series Skins on episode 7, "Michelle."

Discography
Studio Albums
 Lost Love (2006)
 Tragic Trouble (2010)

Videography

References

Indie rock musical groups from New York (state)
Musical groups established in 2004
Musical groups from Brooklyn
2004 establishments in New York City